Studley is an unincorporated community in Hanover County, Virginia, United States. Studley has a post office with ZIP code 23162.

Patrick Henry's Birthplace Archeological Site, Pine Slash, Totomoi, Williamsville, and Wyoming are listed on the National Register of Historic Places.

References

Unincorporated communities in Hanover County, Virginia
Unincorporated communities in Virginia